Irene Haines is a Republican member of the Connecticut House of Representatives. She represents District 34, which includes Colchester, East Haddam and East Hampton.

Personal life 
Haines lives in East Haddam.

Political Positions 
Haines is a proponent of banning balloon releases.

References 

Businesspeople from Connecticut
Republican Party members of the Connecticut House of Representatives
Women state legislators in Connecticut
21st-century American politicians
21st-century American women politicians
Living people
Year of birth missing (living people)
People from East Haddam, Connecticut